Frederick George Brabazon Ponsonby, 6th Earl of Bessborough (11 September 1815 – 11 March 1895), was an Anglo-Irish peer who played first-class cricket 1834–56 for Surrey, Cambridge Town Club (aka Cambridgeshire), Cambridge University (CUCC) and Marylebone Cricket Club (MCC).

Background and education
Ponsonby was born in Marylebone, the third son of John Ponsonby, 4th Earl of Bessborough, and his wife Lady Maria Fane. He was educated at Harrow and Trinity College, Cambridge. In 1837 he was admitted to Lincoln's Inn, and was called to the Bar in 1840. He inherited the earldom on 28 January 1880 when his elder brother died without a male heir.

Cricket
Throughout his cricket career, Bessborough was known as the Hon. Frederic Ponsonby. He played at both Harrow and Cambridge University, batting right-handed. He was an active player until about 1845, after which, due to an arm injury, he could only play sporadically. Ponsonby was a founder of Surrey County Cricket Club and was elected its first vice-president. He was also a founder of I Zingari, and of the Old Stagers amateur theatre company.

Personal life
Lord Bessborough died at Westminster on 11 March 1895. He never married, and was succeeded in the earldom by his younger brother, Walter.

References

External links 
 thepeerage.com
 Cracroft's Peerage
 
 Frederick Ponsonby at ESPNcricinfo

1815 births
1895 deaths
Ponsonby, Frederick
Ponsonby, Frederick
Ponsonby, Frederick
Ponsonby, Frederick
Ponsonby, Frederick
Ponsonby, Frederick
Ponsonby, Frederick
Ponsonby, Frederick
Frederick Ponsonby, 06th Earl of Bessborough
Directors of the Great Western Railway
Gentlemen cricketers
Gentlemen of England cricketers
People educated at Harrow School
Alumni of Trinity College, Cambridge
Frederick 06